This is a list of all the research and Science activity the Canadian space agency has done.

CSA reported ISS Research and Science Activity

Experiments
 APEX-CAMBIUM - Advanced Plant Experiments on Orbit
Funded by the Canadian Space Agency (CSA), APEX-Cambium will help determine the role gravity plays in trees forming different kinds of wood.
 BCAT-5 - Binary Colloidal Alloy Test
 BISE - Bodies In the Space Environment
 CCISS - Space travel can be dizzying
 EVARM - Radiation monitoring experiment
Radiation monitoring experiment is called EVARM and it was conducted in 2002 and 2003
 H-Reflex (ISS Experiment)
 MEIS-2 (ISS Experiment)
 MVIS (ISS Experiment)
 PMDIS (ISS Experiment)
 SODI-IVIDIL (ISS Experiment)
 RaDI-N (ISS Experiment)

Fields
 Space Medicine

References

See Also
Canadian Space Agency
Scientific research on the International Space Station

International Space Station experiments
Space program of Canada